The Ralph Bristol House is a home in Ogden, Utah built c. 1912 by businessman Ralph Bristol. It is located at 2480 Van Buren Avenue. The wrought iron porch roof is said to have been a gift from a French political figure.  It is also rumored that Leroy Eccles built his larger and more stately house at 1029 25th Street in response to Mr. Bristol's house. (Mr. Eccles previously resided at 2555 Eccles Avenue.)

Buildings and structures in Ogden, Utah
Houses completed in 1912
Houses in Weber County, Utah
1912 establishments in Utah